Jayshan District  is a district of the Abyan Governorate, Yemen. As of 2003, the district had a population of 14,800 inhabitants.

References

Districts of Abyan Governorate